G2 and S phase-expressed protein 1 is an enzyme that in humans is encoded by the GTSE1 gene.

The protein encoded by this gene is only expressed in the S and G2 phases of the cell cycle, where it colocalizes with cytoplasmic tubulin and microtubules. In response to DNA damage, the encoded protein accumulates in the nucleus and binds the tumor suppressor protein p53, shuttling it out of the nucleus and repressing its ability to induce apoptosis.

References

Further reading